Pudukkottai railway station is a railway station in Pudukkottai town, serving the people of Pudukkottai District in Tamil Nadu. It falls under the operational limits of Madurai Railway Division of the Southern Railway zone. It is a major as well as an important passing station present on the Tiruchirappalli-Karaikkudi railway line. It is under the station category B.

The station serves as an alternative rail route to the southern districts of Tamil Nadu.

History 
As early as 1886, a plan to link Pudukkottai by rail with Trichy and other places was mooted. But as the princely state of Pudukkottai was ruled by a king while most other parts of South India were under the British, protracted negotiations between these two authorities took place, specially with regard to the cost-bearing of the proposed railway line. Later, in 1921, a traffic-survey of the proposed Tiruchirapalli- Pudukkottai- Karaikudi- line was prepared by Rao Sahib S. Krishnamachari of South Indian Railways (SIR). It was estimated that the cost of construction of the railway line would work out to Rs 1.32 lakhs per mile. After a brief period of construction, the Trichy- Pudukkottai line was inaugurated on 17 April 1929 and Pudukkottai- Sivaganga line on 1 July 1930 and from Sivaganga to Manamadurai already Railway Connectivity Exist from 1909 itself, so there by this railway line construction converted the Sivaganga Terminal Branch line into a connectivity line from Trichinopoly to Manamadurai.

Location and layout 

It is not easily accessible as it is located far away from the main town. It can be accessed through a cab or an auto.

Before the gauge conversion, the station had only 3 tracks. Now an additional fourth track has been constructed for handling goods trains. As it is a passing station, there are no pit lines available. There is also a considerable amount of space available for the extension of the railway station in future.

Services 
All the trains bound to Karaikkudi, Manamadurai and few trains bound to Rameswaram and Kanyakumari from Chennai Egmore and  Tiruchirappalli pass through this station. Most of the trains have a stoppage here for a minimum of 1–2 minutes.

References

External links 

Madurai railway division
Railway stations in Pudukkottai district
Railway stations opened in 1929